The 1987–88 IHL season was the 43rd season of the International Hockey League, a North American minor professional league. Nine teams participated in the regular season, and the Salt Lake Golden Eagles won the Turner Cup. The Indianapolis Ice joined the league in the following 1988-89 IHL season.

Regular season

Turner Cup-Playoffs

External links
 Season 1987/88 on hockeydb.com 

IHL
International Hockey League (1945–2001) seasons